Shorea alutacea is a species of tree in the family Dipterocarpaceae. It is endemic to Borneo, where it is confined to Sarawak.

Shorea alutacea is a medium-sized to large tree, growing up to 35 meters tall.

It grows in lowland forests, including mixed dipterocarp forest, riverine forest, and limestone forest, up to 300 meters elevation.

References

alutacea
Endemic flora of Borneo
Trees of Borneo
Flora of Sarawak
Flora of the Borneo lowland rain forests
Taxonomy articles created by Polbot